Tropidia notata is a species of hoverfly in the family Syrphidae.

Distribution
Chile, Argentina.

References

Eristalinae
Diptera of South America
Taxa named by Jacques-Marie-Frangile Bigot
Insects described in 1882